"What's in Our Heart" is a song written by George Jones and Johnny "Country" Mathis.  It was recorded and released as a B-side duet by American country artists George Jones (the song's co-writer) and Melba Montgomery.  It was recorded at the Columbia Recording Studio, located in Nashville, Tennessee, United States on May 23, 1963. The recording date was the second session that took place between Jones and Montgomery. Other songs included on the session were "Let's Invite Them Over", "Suppose Tonight Would Be Our Last", and "I Let You Go". The recording session included The Nashville A-Team of musicians, whom appeared on other recordings by the pair. The session was produced by Pappy Daily.  "What's in Our Heart" was issued as the B-side to the pair's 1963 single "Let's Invite Them Over". The song received radio airplay and reached the twentieth position on the Billboard Magazine Hot Country Singles list. It became the duo's third major hit single together.

Chart performance

References 

1963 singles
1963 songs
Male vocal duets
George Jones songs
Melba Montgomery songs
Songs written by George Jones
United Artists Records singles
Song recordings produced by Pappy Daily
Songs written by "Country" Johnny Mathis